Vincent Kyle Buys (born March 21, 1979) was a member of the Washington House of Representatives, representing the 42nd district. He was the ranking member of the House Agriculture and Natural Resources Committee. He also served on the Appropriations Committee and the Appropriations Subcommittee on General Government and IT

Buys earned an Associate of Science degree from in electronic technologies and electronics from Bellingham Technical College.

Awards 
 2014 Guardians of Small Business award. Presented by NFIB.

References

1979 births
Living people
Republican Party members of the Washington House of Representatives
21st-century American politicians